Scopula nepalensis is a moth of the family Geometridae. It is found in Nepal.

References

Moths described in 1982
nepalensis
Moths of Asia